Adriaan de Groot (born 6 January 1973) is a researcher in software quality and formal verification. He has lived in Nijmegen, Netherlands since 1990. He is a KDE developer, member of KDE e.V. board and coordinator of KDE Netherlands.

Born in Calgary, Alberta, Canada, de Groot has been a KDE contributor since 2000. He works on porting KDE to both FreeBSD and Solaris. Since 2007, he has also been a member of KDE e.V. board.  In summer 2009 he was elected as vice president of KDE e.V.

References

External links
 People behind KDE
Practical Automaton Proofs in PVS (PhD Thesis)

1973 births
Living people
Dutch computer programmers
Free software programmers
KDE
People from Calgary
Radboud University Nijmegen alumni